Moshampa (also Romanized as Moshampā) is a village in Chaypareh-ye Pain Rural District of Zanjanrud District of Zanjan County, Zanjan province, Iran. At the 2006 National Census, its population was 1,195 in 288 households. The following census in 2011 counted 1,229 people in 339 households. The latest census in 2016 showed a population of 1,203 people in 382 households; it was the largest village in its rural district.

References 

Zanjan County

Populated places in Zanjan Province

Populated places in Zanjan County